is a Japanese manga series written and illustrated by Minoru Takeyoshi. It was serialized in Shogakukan's seinen manga magazine Weekly Big Comic Spirits from April 2019 to September 2021, with its chapters collected in eight tankōbon volumes.

Publication
Written and illustrated by Minoru Takeyoshi, Battleground Workers was serialized in Shogakukan's seinen manga magazine Weekly Big Comic Spirits from April 22, 2019, to September 27, 2021. Shogakukan collected its chapters in eight tankōbon volumes, released from August 30, 2019, to November 30, 2021.

Volume list

See also
Hengoku no Schwester—another manga series by the same author.

References

Further reading

External links
 

Action anime and manga
Mecha anime and manga
Seinen manga
Shogakukan manga